The 2012 Júbilo Iwata season is Júbilo Iwata's 19th consecutive season in J. League Division 1 and 30th overall in the Japanese top flight. Júbilo Iwata are also competing in the 2012 Emperor's Cup and 2012 J. League Cup.

Players

Competitions

J. League

League table

Matches

J. League Cup

Emperor's Cup

References

Jubilo Iwata
Júbilo Iwata seasons